Aroga eriogonella is a moth of the family Gelechiidae. It is found in North America, where it has been recorded from Washington, Idaho, Wyoming, Arizona and California.

The larvae feed on Eriogonum heracleoides.

References

Moths described in 1935
Aroga
Moths of North America